Jalawla (also known as Jalula) is a town in Diyala Governorate, Iraq. The town is populated by Arabs, Kurds and Turkmens.

History

Early history
Jalawla was the center of the Sasanian Šāḏ Qobāḏ Province and the Khurasan Road crossed the town. The Sasanians ultimately lost control over the town after the Battle of Jalula in 637 to Muslim invaders.

Modern history
Jalawla has been the center town of Jalawla District since its creation with a Republican decree in 1958. Prior to the decree, Jalawla was part of Saadiya District. Before the launch of the Ba'athist Arabization campaigns in North Iraq in the 1960s, the town had a Kurdish majority. In the 1970s, Iraq deported a large portion of the Kurdish population of the town after having denaturalized them as Arabs were encouraged to settle instead, to intensify the Arabization of the town. Of the 28,822 people enumerated in the 1977 census, 77% were Arab, 19.8% were Kurdish and Turkmens constituted 2.5% of the population. In the 1987 census, the Arab population increased to 85.2%, while the Kurdish population decreased to 12.9% and the Turkmen to 1.7%. In the 1997 census, the Arab population stood at 83.7%, the Kurdish at 14.3% and the Turkmen at 1.9%.

Kurdish rebels (Peshmerga) captured the town on 12 March 1991 during the uprisings. The town later experienced assaults from the Iraqi-backed People's Mujahedin of Iran which had taken part in the repression of the nationwide uprisings. After the fall of Saddam Hussein in 2003, Kurdistan Region pressured Arab settlers in Khanaqin to settle in Jalawla which increased the Arab population further. Moreover, many Kurds returned to the town but left again due to the lack of security. Concurrently, the Arab al-Shuraifi tribe, which had settled in the area in the 1970s, was expelled from both Jalawla and Khanaqin after direct order from Kurdish politician Jalal Talabani.

ISIS and the aftermath 
According to some estimates, 80% of the population was Arab when ISIS entered the town in 2014, while more than 85% of the former Kurdish population lived in IDP camps and nearby towns. From August to November 2014 the city was mostly under the control of the Islamic State of Iraq and Syria after having seized the town from Peshmerga in August 2014. On 23 November 2014, the PMF and Peshmerga jointly recaptured the city, under the command of Iranian General Qassem Soleimani. The town was jointly controlled by PMF and Peshmerga until October 2017 when the Peshmerga withdrew from the area. When Jalawla was captured from ISIS, a portion of the Kurdish population returned after encouragement from the federal government, while Peshmerga stated that no member of the Arab Kerwi tribe would be allowed back after having supported ISIS. Nonetheless, the tribe returned after Peshmerga withdrew in October 2017. Moreover, the Arab animosity towards Kurds have made it possible for Asa'ib Ahl al-Haq to recruit a number of local Arabs into its ranks and marginalize the Kurdish population. However, according to the Patriotic Union of Kurdistan and the local Sunni Arab leadership, many locals mainly support them due to fear and the exploitation of the right to return for Arabs.

References

Populated places in Diyala Province
Kurdish settlements in Iraq
Turkmen communities in Iraq